Bilibino is a town and the administrative center of Bilibinsky District in Chukotka Autonomous Okrug, Russia. It is the second largest town in the autonomous okrug after Anadyr. Population:

Geography

The town of Bilibino was built at the confluence of the Karalveyem and Bolshoy Keperveyem Rivers (Kolyma's basin).

Bilibino is on the transition zone between the conifer forest and the tundra of the East Siberian Mountains, southeast of the Pyrkanay Range (Горы Пырканай), southwest of the Rauchuan Range (Раучуанский хребет) and north of the Kyrganay Range and the Chuvan Mountains.

History
As with much of the rest of Chukotka, the earliest human remains found in the region around Bilibino have been dated to the Early Neolithic, with camp sites having been excavated at Orlovka 2, a site on the banks of the Orlovka River, as well as at Lakes Tytyl and Ilirney.

Interest in the area around the present day site of the town began in the 1920s when prospectors including Soviet geologist Yuri Bilibin (1901—1952) discovered gold in the region and began to make assessments regarding the commercial viability of its extraction. In March 1955, gold mining operations commenced and the construction of a settlement started, though at this stage it was little more than a collection of geologists' and prospectors' tents, who had originally been based in Seymchan. Because of his discovery of gold in the region, particularly within the vicinity of the Bolshoy Anyuy and Maly Anyuy Rivers, the geologists named the new settlement after Yury Bilibin, and the new name was officially adopted in February 1956. On September 6, 1958, Bilibino was granted urban-type settlement status.

Bilibino's  development intensified in the early 1960s when it was joined to the Pevek power grid. On August 2, 1961, Bilibino became the administrative center of the Eastern Tundra District (Rayon Vostochnoy Tundry) which was renamed Bilibino District (Bilibinsky Rayon) on the occasion. In 1965, the Soviet government decided to build the Bilibino Nuclear Power Plant. The construction aided by several hundred volunteers from the Komsomol organization was completed in 1974; by 1976 three additional reactors were put into operation. Town status was granted to Bilibino on June 28, 1993.

Administrative and municipal status
Within the framework of administrative divisions, Bilibino serves as the administrative center of Bilibinsky District, to which it is directly subordinated. As a municipal division, the town of Bilibino is, together with the selo of Keperveyem, incorporated within Bilibinsky Municipal District as Bilibino Urban Settlement.

Economy
The town is home to the world's northernmost nuclear power plant, the Bilibino Nuclear Power Plant, which opened in January 1974. It is the only nuclear power plant in the Russian Far East and has four reactors, each with an output of 12 MWe. The plant will be progressively shut down and decommissioned, and will be replaced by the Akademik Lomonosov floating nuclear power plant. The first reactor was shut down at the end of 2018.

Transportation
The region where Bilibino is located has virtually no roads that are usable year-round; even a trip from the Keperveyem Airport to Bilibino town requires a  journey along an unpaved road. There is also an unpaved road to the seaport of Zelyony Mys on the Kolyma River near Chersky in the Sakha Republic (around 250 km). Heavier transports use this road. There is a winter-only ice road between Pevek and Bilibino.

Demographics
In a typical development for the post-Soviet era in the Russian Far East, Bilibino's population dropped significantly after the dissolution of the Soviet Union. During the 1989 Soviet Census, the population of Bilibino was 15,558; it fell to 6,181 in the 2002 Census and further down to 5,506 in the 2010 Russian Census. As of January 2010, the ethnic make up of the town was mostly Russians (71%) and Ukrainians (15%); Chukchi people and Evens accounted for 6% and 3%, correspondingly; with all other ethnicities accounting for less than 1% each.

Climate
Bilibino has a subarctic climate (Dfc) according to the Köppen climate classification. Summers are short and cool with chilly nights, while winters are long, dry and bitterly cold.

References

Notes

Sources

Petit Fute. Chukotka.

External links
Official website of Bilibino 
Bilibino Business Directory 
BBC. Description of a visit to the power plant
Bilibino Photo Gallery
Short film about Bilibino

Cities and towns in Chukotka Autonomous Okrug
Cities and towns built in the Soviet Union
Populated places established in 1955
Populated places of Arctic Russia
1955 establishments in Russia
Road-inaccessible communities of Russia